Justicia warmingii is a plant native to the Cerrado vegetation of Brazil.

See also
 List of plants of Cerrado vegetation of Brazil

warmingii
Flora of Brazil